Stadtaffe ( "urban ape") is the first and only solo album by German musician Peter Fox. Released 26 September 2008, the standard version contains twelve tracks, four of which have been released as singles. Fox performed the single "Schwarz zu blau" at the Bundesvision Song Contest 2009 in Potsdam while representing Berlin, and won, becoming the first person to win the contest twice (his first win coming in 2006 as a member of the band Seeed). The album was certified 6× platinum for shipping 1.2 million copies in Germany and is the third-most-downloaded album of all time there, selling 100,000 copies from downloads only.

Musikexpress voted Stadtaffe 19th on the list of the 100 best German albums of all time.

Chart performance 
Stadtaffe entered the German albums chart at number 4 and reached its peak position number 1, which it reached on four non-consecutive occasions.
It managed to stay in the top 10 for a total of 41 weeks and stayed in the top 50 for 92 weeks.

Track listing 

The song Alles neu with its violin riff from Shostakovich's Symphony No. 7 was sampled by both Plan B (Ill Manors) and Raffy L'z.

Charts

Weekly charts

Year-end charts

Certifications

References

External links 
 PeterFox.de — official site

2008 albums
Peter Fox (musician) albums
Warner Music Group albums
European Border Breakers Award-winning albums